Mohnia is a genus of sea snails, marine gastropod mollusks in the subfamily Siphonaliinae  of the  family Buccinidae, the true whelks.

Species
Species within the genus Mohnia include:
 Mohnia abyssorum (Fischer P., 1883)
 Mohnia blakei (A. E. Verrill, 1885)
 Mohnia carolinensis (Verrill, 1884): synonym of Retimohnia carolinensis (A. E. Verrill, 1884)
 Mohnia danielsseni (Friele, 1879)
 Mohnia krampi (Thorson, 1951)
 Mohnia mohni (Friele, 1877)
 Mohnia parva (Verrill & Smith, 1882)
 Mohnia simplex (Verrill, 1884)
Species brought into synonymy
 Mohnia (Tacita): synonym of Tacita Lus, 1971
 Mohnia attenuata Golikov & Gulbin, 1977: synonym of Retifusus attenuatus (Golikov & Gulbin, 1977)
 Mohnia bella (Ozaki, 1958): synonym of Retimohnia bella (Ozaki, 1958)
 Mohnia buccinoides Dall, 1913: synonym of Retimohnia buccinoides (Dall, 1913)
 Mohnia caelata (Verrill & Smith, 1880): synonym of Retimohnia caelata (Verrill, 1880)
 Mohnia corbis Dall, 1913: synonym of Fusipagoda corbis (Dall, 1913)
 Mohnia daphnelloides Okutani, 1964: synonym of Retimohnia daphnelloides (Okutani, 1964)
 Mohnia exquisita Dall, 1913: synonym of Fusipagoda exquisita (Dall, 1913)
 Mohnia frielei Dall, 1891: synonym of Retimohnia frielei (Dall, 1891)
 Mohnia glypta (Verrill, 1882): synonym of Retimohnia glypta (A. E. Verrill, 1882)
 Mohnia iturupa Golikov & Sirenko, 1998: synonym of Retifusus iturupus (Golikov & Sirenko, 1998)
 Mohnia iwateana Tiba, 1981: synonym of Retimohnia bella (Ozaki, 1958)
 Mohnia kaicherae Petuch, 1987: synonym of Manaria fusiformis (Clench & Aguayo, 1941)
 Mohnia kurilana Dall, 1913: synonym of Pseudomohnia kurilana (Dall, 1913) (original combination)
 Mohnia multicostata Habe & Ito, 1965: synonym of Mohnia bella (Ozaki, 1958)
 Mohnia okhotskana Tiba, 1981: synonym of Retifusus olivaceus (Bartsch, 1929)
 Mohnia robusta Dall, 1913: synonym of Retimohnia robusta (Dall, 1913)
 Mohnia similis Golikov & Gulbin, 1977: synonym of Retifusus similis (Golikov & Gulbin, 1977)
 Mohnia toyamana Tiba, 1981: synonym of Retimohnia toyamana (Tiba, 1981)
 Mohnia twateana Tiba, 1981: synonym of Mohnia bella (Ozaki, 1958)

References

 Gofas, S.; Le Renard, J.; Bouchet, P. (2001). Mollusca, in: Costello, M.J. et al. (Ed.) (2001). European register of marine species: a check-list of the marine species in Europe and a bibliography of guides to their identification. Collection Patrimoines Naturels, 50: pp. 180–213

External links
 Friele H. 1879. Catalog der auf der norwegischen Nordmeer-Expedition bei Spitzbergen gefundenen Mollusken. Jahrbücher der Deutschen Malakozoologischen Gesellschaft, 6: 264-286

Buccinidae